Serupepeli Vularika (born 29 April 1990) is a Fijian rugby union player, currently playing for the LA Giltinis of Major League Rugby (MLR). His preferred position is scrum-half or Centre.

Professional career
Vularika signed for the LA Giltinis during the 2021 Major League Rugby season in April 2021. He had previously represented the Fijian Drua in the 2018 and 2019 National Rugby Championship. He also has 12 caps for the Fiji national team, making his debut in 2016.

References

External links
itsrugby.co.uk Profile

1990 births
Living people
Fijian rugby union players
Fiji international rugby union players
Rugby union scrum-halves
Rugby union centres
Fijian Drua players
LA Giltinis players
New England Free Jacks players